Pharmacology of progesterone can be divided into:

 Pharmacodynamics of progesterone
 Pharmacokinetics of progesterone

See also
 Pharmacodynamics of estradiol
 Pharmacokinetics of estradiol